North Spring Lake was a borough that existed in Monmouth County, New Jersey, United States, from 1884 until 1903.

The Borough of North Spring Lake was incorporated in May 1884, from portions of Wall Township. The borough was reincorporated on January 3, 1893, and gained additional portions of Wall Township in 1899 and 1903.

On February 24, 1903, the borough was annexed to Spring Lake and the municipality of North Spring Lake was dissolved.

References

1884 establishments in New Jersey
1903 disestablishments in New Jersey
Former boroughs in New Jersey
Former municipalities in Monmouth County, New Jersey
Geography of Monmouth County, New Jersey
Spring Lake, New Jersey